Gloptinden is a mountain in Vågå Municipality in Innlandet county, Norway. The mountain is surrounded by several other notable mountains including Kollhøin to the northeast, Besshø to the east, Surtningssue to the northwest, and Styggehøi to the north.

See also
List of mountains of Norway by height

References

Jotunheimen
Vågå
Mountains of Innlandet